8th Najaf Ashraf Armored Division is a division of the Islamic Revolutionary Guard Corps.

It was first officially organized as the 8th Najaf Ashraf Brigade during Iran–Iraq War, just after Operation Samen-ol-A'emeh. Initially, its fighters were mostly from the Najafabad County, Isfahan Province. The brigade was organized and nicknamed "Najaf Ashraf" by Ahmad Kazemi, which was appointed as its commander by Gholam Ali Rashid. Kazemi asked Mehdi Bakeri to become his deputy, after which forces from Azarbaijan Province and Zanjan Province also joined the unit. When Bakeri became the commander of the 31st Ashura Division, these forces joined the latter. Later, forces from Yazd Province also established their own unit, the 18th Al-Ghadir Brigade, and split from the Najaf Division. With the establishment of the 44th Qamar-e Bani-Hashem Brigade, forces from Kohgiluyeh and Boyer-Ahmad Province and Isfahan Province also left the Najaf Division.

In Operation Beit-ol-Moqaddas, the Najaf Ashraf Brigade was the unit which first broke into Khorramshahr, capturing thousands of Iraqi soldiers.

It was reportedly the first IRGC division to establish an armored unit, using the captured Iraqi armor. The division is also called 8th Najaf Ashraf Armored Division.

Notable members
 Maj.Gen. Ahmad Kazemi (commander)
 Lt. Gen. Mehdi Bakeri (deputy)
 Dep.Com. Hamid Bakeri (commander)
 Brig.Gen Mohammad Pakpour (commander)
Brig.Gen Mansour Haghdoust
 Cpt. Mohsen Hojaji
Lt. Musa Jamshidian
Lt. Mohammad Javad Ghorbani
Lt. Komeil Ghorbani
Lt. Alireza Nouri
Lt. Hassan Ahmadi
Lt. Pouya Izadi
Lt. Ruhollah Kafizade
Lt. Mohsen Heidari
Sgt. Musa Kazemi
Pvt. Shir Hossein Hassani

References

Military units and formations of Army of the Guardians of the Islamic Revolution
Armored divisions of Iran
Isfahan Province